Pascal van der Graaf (born 19 March 1979, Dordrecht) is a Dutch artist who lives and works in Taiwan. He is best known for his landscapes, seascapes and still-life paintings painted in a variety of techniques. His work has been exhibited nationally and internationally.

Biography

In 2001 Van der Graaf graduated at the Academy Minerva (Hanze University of applied sciences, Groningen) as an independent artist. After his graduation Van der Graaf received several grants for his paintings and won the prestigious Royal Award for Modern Painting in 2007. The Royal Award is annually presented to encourage talented young painters active in the Netherlands.

In 2015 Van der Graaf visited Asian countries such as Macau, China, Japan and Taiwan for the first time. These places inspired him in usage of their philosophy and art. He fell in love with Asia and decided to emigrate to Taiwan in 2016.

Work

Van der Graaf is known for being a painter who uses many different techniques to give expression to the subjects he paints. He paints traditional subject such as landscapes, seascapes, still-life and portraits. According to van der Graaf “Painting demands commitment, it cannot be a neutral formalistic exercise”

Grants and Prizes

 2010 Projectsubsidie Nederlandse Ambassade Egypte
 2008 Basisstipendium Fonds BKVB
 2008 Nominatie Koninklijke prijs voor de Schilderkunst
 2007 Koninklijke prijs voor de Schilderkunst
 2004 Startstipendium Fonds BKVB
 2003 Startstipendium Fonds BKVB

Exhibitions (selection)

2016
 Kunstruimte Wagemans, The Netherlands
 Macpro Gallery, Macau.

2015

 We Like Art, Art Rotterdam, The Netherlands
 Kunstruimte Wagemans, Art Rotterdam, The Netherlands
 Das Buch, Galerie Roy, Zülpich Germany

2014

 Don’t feed the Animals, Galerie Tsjalling, Groningen The Netherlands
 Basement Project, The Basement, Groningen, The Netherlands
 NOK, Kunstruimte Wagemans, Beetserzwaag, The Netherlands
 Quake, Kunstruimte Wagemans, Amsterdam, The Netherlands

2013

 Drewes de Wit, Pascal van der Graaf and Jan Blank, Kunstruimte Wagemans, Beetsterzwaag, The Netherlands
 Bakkes, Kunstruimte Beesteszwaag, The Netherlands

2012

 Oude Helden, Academie Minerva, Groningen, The Netherlands
 NOK, Kunstruimte Wagemans, Beetserzwaag, The Neterherlands
 Art Amsterdam, Kunstruimte Wagemans, The Netherlands

2011

 Biënnale Cairo, Egypt
 Kunstruimte Wagemans, Realisme Beurs Amsterdam, The Netherlands
 Shaken not stirred, Hot Prospects!, Leusden, The Netherlands

2010

 Past - present – Future, Hot Prospects!, Utrecht, The Netherlands
 Kunstruimte Wagemans Art Amsterdam, The Netherlands
 NOK, Museum Belvédère, The Netherlands

2009

 Galerie Maurits van de Laar Art Rotterdam, The Netherlands
 Kunstruimte Wagemans, Beetsterzwaag, The Netherlands
 Art Amsterdam, Kunstruimte Wagemans, The Netherlands

2008

 GeM (Museum voor Actuele Kunst) Koninklijke Prijs voor de Vrije Schilderkunst, The Hague, the Netherlands
 Nieuwe Uitleenschatten, CBK Groningen, The Netherlands
 Apokalupsis Eschaton, NP3, Groningen, The Netherlands
 NOK, Nationaal Rijtuigmuseum, Leek, The Netherlands
 Gijs Assmann and Pascal van der Graaf, Galerie 10, Utrecht, The Netherlands
 Pascal van der Graaf, Ingrid van der Hoeven and Justin Wijers, Galerie Maurits van de Laar, The Hague, The Netherlands
 Laag 52, Galerie De Aanschouw, Rotterdam, The Netherlands

2007

 Koninklijke Prijs Voor Vrije Schilderkunst, GEM, The Hague, The Netherlands

External links
 Official website
 website fred wagemans

References

1979 births
Living people
Artists from Dordrecht
Dutch male painters
21st-century Dutch painters